John Stuart-Wortley, 2nd Baron Wharncliffe FRS (20 April 1801 – 22 October 1855), was a British Tory politician. He served briefly as Under-Secretary of State for War and the Colonies between December 1834 and January 1835.

Background
A member of the Stuart family headed by the Marquess of Bute, Wharncliffe was the son of James Stuart-Wortley, 1st Baron Wharncliffe, and his wife Lady Caroline Elizabeth Mary Crichton, daughter of John Crichton, 1st Earl Erne. He was the elder brother of Charles Stuart-Wortley and James Stuart-Wortley.

Political career
Wharncliffe sat as Member of Parliament for Bossiney from 1823 to 1830, for Perth Burghs from 1830 to 1831 and for the West Riding of Yorkshire from 1841 to 1845. He served under the Duke of Wellington as Secretary to the Board of Control in 1830 and under Sir Robert Peel as Under-Secretary of State for War and the Colonies from 1834 to 1835. In 1845 succeeded his father in the barony and took his seat in the House of Lords.

Lord Wharncliffe was elected a Fellow of the Royal Society on 4 June 1829.

Family
Lord Wharncliffe married Lady Georgiana Elizabeth Ryder, daughter of Dudley Ryder, 1st Earl of Harrowby, in 1825. They had five children:

Hon. Mary Caroline Stuart-Wortley (17 October 1826 – 2 April 1896), married Henry Moore, 3rd Marquess of Drogheda on 27 August 1847, without issue.
Edward Montagu-Stuart-Wortley-Mackenzie, 1st Earl of Wharncliffe (1827–1899).
Hon. Francis Dudley Stuart-Wortley-Mackenzie (23 July 1829 – 21 October 1893), married Maria Elizabeth Martin on 28 August 1855 and had issue.
Hon. James Stuart-Wortley (1833–1870).
Hon. Cecily Susan Stuart-Wortley-Mackenzie (1835 – 2 May 1915), married Henry Montagu-Scott, 1st Baron Montagu of Beaulieu on 4 August 1865 and had issue.

Lord Wharncliffe died on 22 October 1855, aged 54, at Wortley Hall, Wortley, and was succeeded in the barony by his eldest son Edward, who was created Earl of Wharncliffe in 1876. Lady Wharncliffe survived her husband by almost 30 years and died in August 1884.

Ancestry

Works
 Abolition of the Vice-Royalty of Ireland (1850)

References

External links 
 

 

1801 births
1855 deaths
Barons in the Peerage of the United Kingdom
Stuart-Wortley-Mackenzie, John
Stuart-Wortley-Mackenzie, John
Stuart-Wortley-Mackenzie, John
Stuart-Wortley-Mackenzie, John
Stuart-Wortley-Mackenzie, John
Stuart-Wortley-Mackenzie, John
UK MPs who inherited peerages
Members of the Parliament of the United Kingdom for Scottish constituencies
Stuart-Wortley-Mackenzie, John
John
Fellows of the Royal Society
Eldest sons of British hereditary barons